Nationality words link to articles with information on the nation's poetry or literature (for instance, Irish or France).

Events
 Spring – August Derleth launches the poetry magazine Hawk and Whippoorwill in the United States.
 September 5 – Welsh poet Waldo Williams is imprisoned for six weeks for non-payment of income tax (a protest against defence spending).
 An inscription of an excerpt of the Poema de Fernán González is discovered on a roofing tile in Merindad de Sotoscueva, the earliest known record of it.

Works published in English
Listed by nation where the work was first published and again by the poet's native land, if different; substantially revised works listed separately:

Canada
 Margaret Avison, Winter Sun
 Daryl Hine, The Devil's Picture Book
 Kenneth McRobbie, Eyes Without a Face
 Eli Mandel, Fuseli Poems
 Peter Miller, Sonata for Frog and Man

Anthologies
 Edmund Snow Carpenter, American anthropologist, editor, Anerca, anonymous Eskimo poems, with drawings by Enooesweetok
 A. J. M. Smith, editor, The Oxford book of Canadian verse, in English and French, including untranslated poems in French combined in chronological order with English-language poems

India, in English

 Nissim Ezekiel, The Unfinished Man: Poems Written in 1959, Calcutta: Writers Workshop, India
 Dom Moraes, John Nobody, Indian at this time living in the United Kingdom
 Deb Kumar Das, The Night before Us, Calcutta: Writers Workshop, India
 Pradip Sen, And Then the Sun, first edition (revised edition, 1968), Calcutta: Writers Workshop, India
 Raul De Loyola Furtado, The Oleanders and Other Poems, Calcutta: Writers Workshop, India
 Keshav Malik, The Rippled Shadow
 Barjor Paymaster, the Last Farewell and Other Poems, Bombay: Asia Publishing House
 V. Madhusudan Reddy, Sapphires of Solitude, Hyderabad: V. Man Mohan Reddy
 Sasthi Brata, Eleven Poems, Calcutta: published by the author

United Kingdom
 W. H. Auden, Homage to Clio
 Sir John Betjeman, Summoned by Bells
 Edwin Bronk, A Family Affair, Northwood, Middlesex: Scorpion Press
 Austin Clarke, The Hore-Eaters (see also Ancient Lights 1955, Too Great a Vine 1957)
 Patric Dickinson, The World I See
 Lawrence Durrell, Collected Poems
 D. J. Enright, Some Men Are Brothers
 Ted Hughes, Lupercal, London: Faber and Faber; New York: Harper
 John Knight, Straight Lines and Unicorns
 Peter Levi, The Gravel Ponds
 Patrick Kavanagh, Come Dance with Kitty Stobling
 Norman MacCaig, A Common Grace
 Dom Moraes, Poems, Indian at this time living in the United Kingdom
 Edwin Muir, Collected Poems (posthumous)
 Sylvia Plath, The Colossus and Other Poems, American at this time living in the United Kingdom
 William Plomer, Collected Poems
 Peter Redgrove, The Collector, and Other Poems, London: Routledge and Kegan Paul
 James Reeves, Collected Poems 1929–59
 Charles Tomlinson, Seeing is Believing
 Andrew Young, Collected Poems

United States
 John Ashbery, The Poems
 W. H. Auden, Homage to Clio
 Paul Blackburn, Brooklyn Manhattan Transit: A Bouquet for Flatbush
 Gwendolyn Brooks, The Bean Eaters, including "We Real Cool"
 Witter Bynner, New Poems
 Gregory Corso, The Happy Birthday of Death
 Louis Coxe, The Middle Passage
 E. E. Cummings, Collected Poems
 James Dickey, Into the Stone
 Robert Duncan:
 The Opening of the Field
 Selected Poems, San Francisco: City Lights Books
 Richard Eberhart, Collected Poems 1930–1960
 Paul Engle, Poems in Praise, including the sonnet sequence "For the Iowa Dead"
 Jean Garrigue, A Water Walk by Villa d'Este
 Ramon Guthrie, Graffiti
 Anthony Hecht, A Bestiary
 Daryl Hine, The Devil's Picture Book
 Daniel G. Hoffman, A Little Geste and Other Poems
 Randall Jarrell, The Woman at the Washington Zoo, New York: Atheneum
 LeRoi Jones, Preface to a Twenty Volume Suicide Note, New York: Totem/Corinth Books
 Donald Justice, The Summer Anniversaries
 Weldon Kees, The Collected Poems of Weldon Kees posthumous, edited by Donald Justice
 Jack Kerouac, Mexico City Blues
 Galway Kinnell, What a Kingdom It Was, Boston: Houghton Mifflin
 Denise Levertov, With Eyes at the Back of Our Heads
 Robert Lowell, Life Studies, New York: Farrar, Straus & Cudahy
 Phyllis McGinley, Times Three: Selected Verse from Three Decades
 James Merrill, Water Street, Atheneum Publishers
 W. S. Merwin:
 The Drunk in the Furnace, New York: Macmillan (reprinted as part of The First Four Books of Poems, 1975)
 Translator, The Satires of Persius, Bloomington, Indiana: Indiana University Press
 Joesphine Miles, Poems 1930–1960
 Howard Moss, A Winter Come, a Summer Gone: Poems 1946-1960, New York: Scribner's
 Howard Nemerov, New and Selected Poems, University of Chicago Press
 John Frederick Nims, Knowledge of the Evening
 Charles Olson:
 The Distances, New York: Grove Press
 The Maximus Poems, New York: Jargon/Corinth Books
 Kenneth Patchen, Because It Is
 Ezra Pound, Thrones: 96-109 de los Cantares, multi-lingual cantos
 Carl Sandburg, Wind Song
 Anne Sexton, To Bedlam and Part Way Back, Boston: Houghton Mifflin
 Wilfred Townley Scott, Scrimshaw
 W. D. Snodgrass, Heart's Needle
 Gary Snyder, Myths and Texts
 William Stafford, West of Your City
 Eleanor Ross Taylor, Wilderness of Ladies
 Theodore Weiss, Outlanders, New York: Macmillan
 Reed Whittemore, The Self-Made Man and Other Poems
 Yvor Winters, Collected Poems, Chicago: The Swallow Press

Criticism, scholarship and biography
 Cleanth Brooks and Robert Penn Warren, Understanding Poetry (college textbook), originally published in 1938, goes into its third edition (a fourth will be published in 1976)
 Ed Dorn, What I See in the Maximum Poems, Migrant Press (criticism)
 Karl Shapiro, In Defense of Ignorance, an attack on the dominant critical values of modern poetry in the vein of T. S. Eliot, W. B. Yeats and Ezra Pound

The New American Poetry 1945-1960

The New American Poetry 1945-1960, a poetry anthology edited by Donald Allen, and published in 1960, aimed to pick out the "third generation" of American modernist poets. In the longer term it attained a classic status, with critical approval and continuing sales. It was reprinted in 1999.

Poets represented:

Helen Adam – John Ashbery – Paul Blackburn – Robin Blaser – Ebbe Borregaard – Bruce Boyd – Ray Bremser – Brother Antoninus – James Broughton – Paul Carroll – Gregory Corso – Robert Creeley – Edward Dorn – Kirby Doyle – Robert Duerden – Robert Duncan – Larry Eigner – Lawrence Ferlinghetti – Edward Field – Allen Ginsberg – Madeline Gleason – Barbara Guest – LeRoi Jones – Jack Kerouac – Kenneth Koch – Philip Lamantia – Denise Levertov – Ron Loewinsohn – Edward Marshall – Michael McClure – David Meltzer – Frank O'Hara – Charles Olson – Joel Oppenheimer – Peter Orlovsky – Stuart Perkoff – James Schuyler – Gary Snyder – Gilbert Sorrentino – Jack Spicer – Lew Welch – Philip Whalen – John Wieners – Jonathan Williams

Other in English

 Allen Curnow, The Penguin Book of New Zealand Verse, New Zealand

Works in other languages
Listed by nation where the work was first published and again by the poet's native land, if different; substantially revised works listed separately:

French language

Canada, in French

 Anne Hébert, Poèmes
 Michèle Lalonde:
 Songe de la fiancée détruite
 Geôles
 Paul Morin, Géronte et son mirior
 Jean-Guy Pilon, La mouette et le large, Montréal: l'Hexagone
 Yves Préfontaine, L'Antre du poème
 Pierre Trottier, Les Belles au bois dormant
 Gilles Vigneault, Etraves

Criticism, scholarship and biography
 Gérard Bessette, Les Images en poésie canadienne-française

France
 Louis Aragon, Les Poetes
 Aimé Césaire, Ferrements, Martinique author published in France; Paris: Editions du Seuil
 Georges-Emmanuel Clancier, Evidences
 Michel Deguy, Fragments du cadastre
 Mohammed Dib, Ombre gardienne, with a preface by Louis Aragon
 Jean Follain, Des Heures
 Paul Géraldy, Vous et moi
 Pierre Jean Jouve, Proses
 Pierre Oster, Un nom toujours nouveau
 Saint-John Perse, Chronique
 Jacques Prévert, Histoires
 Tchicaya U Tam'si, À triche-coeur

Spanish language

Latin America
 Manuel Blanco-González, La luna et lluvia
 Dolores Castro, Cantares de vela
 Pablo Antonio Cuadra, El jaguar y la luna (Nicaragua), winner of the Rubén Darío Prize
 Manuel Durán, La paloma azul
 Germán Pardo García, Centauro al sol
 León de Greiff, Obras completas, with a preliminary study by Jorge Zalamea (Colombia)
 Carlos García-Prada, editor, Escala del sueño, anthology of 35 Castilian lyrical poets
 Elías Nandino, Nocturna palabra (Mexico)

Criticism, scholarship and biography
 Emilio Armaza, Eguren, an anthology and analysis of the Peruvian poet's verse
 Antonio Oliver Belmás, Este otro Rubén Darío
 Gastón Figueira, De la vida y la obra de Gabriela Mistral
 Manuel Pedro González, editor, Antología crítica de José Marti, including writing by Darío, Gabriela Mistral, Unamuno, and Onís
 Glen L. Kolb, Juan del Valle y Caviedes, "A Study of the Life, Times and Poetry of a Spanish Colonial Satirist"
 Eduardo Neale-Silva, Horizonte humano, the first detailed biographical study of the Colombian poet José Eustasio Rivera
 Federico de Onís, Luis Palês Matos—vida y obra-bibliografía, antología, poesías, inéditas, a study of the Puerto Rican poet's life and artistic development

Other
 Odysseus Elytis, Έξη και μια τύψεις για τον ουρανό ("Six Plus One Remorses For The Sky"), Greece
 H. M. Enzensberger, editor, Museum der modernen Poesie, anthology of international modernist poetry, German
 Haim Gouri, Shoshanat Ruhot ("Compass Rose"), Israeli writing in Hebrew
 Jess Ørnsbo, Digte ("Poems"), Denmark
 Klaus Rifbjerg, Konfrontation, Denmark
 Kedarnath Singh, Abhi Bilkul Abhi, Allahabad: Natya Sahitya Prakashan; India, Hindi

Awards and honors
 Nobel Prize in Literature: St. John Perse (France)

United Kingdom
 Eric Gregory Award: Christopher Levenson
 Queen's Gold Medal for Poetry: John Betjeman

United States
 National Book Award for Poetry: Robert Lowell, Life Studies
 Pulitzer Prize for Poetry: W. D. Snodgrass: Heart's Needle
 Bollingen Prize: Delmore Schwartz
 Fellowship of the Academy of American Poets: Jesse Stuart

Prizes from other nations
 First State Poetry Price (Greece): Odysseus Elytis
 Prix Dante (France): Pierre Jean Jouve
 Canada: Governor General's Award, poetry or drama: Winter Sun, Margaret Avison
 Canada: Governor General's Award, Poésie et théâtre: Poèmes,  Anne Hébert

Births
 January 28 – Robert von Dassanowsky, American academic, writer, poet, film and cultural historian and producer
 February 12 – George Elliott Clarke, Canadian poet and playwright
 April 1 – Frieda Hughes, English-born poet, children's writer and painter
 May 5 - Thomas Boberg, Danish poet and travel writer
 August 31 – Makarand Paranjape, Indian poet
 October 30 – Kathleen Flenniken, American writer, poet, editor and educator
 December 22 – Elvis McGonagall, born Richard Smith, Scottish-born slam poet
 Jeffery Donaldson, Canadian poet, critic and theorist
 Katrina Porteous, Scottish-born poet
 Dipti Saravanamuttu, Sri Lankan-Australian poet, academic, journalist and script writer, moves to Australia as a child in 1972
 Alexis Stamatis, Greek poet
 Karenne Wood, Native American poet

Deaths
Birth years link to the corresponding "[year] in poetry" article:
 January 4 – Nima Yooshij, 62 (born 1897), Iranian poet
 January 14 – Ralph Chubb, 77 (born 1892), English poet, printer and artist
 February 21 – Walter D'Arcy Cresswell (born 1896), New Zealand poet
 February 28 – F. S. Flint (born 1885), English poet, translator and prominent member of the Imagist group
 March 23 – Franklin Pierce Adams, 78 (born 1881), American writer whose "The Conning Tower" column gave critical publicity to many poets and writers, translator of poetry
 May 30 – Boris Pasternak, 70 (born 1890), Russian poet and writer, winner of Nobel Prize in Literature 1958, lung cancer
 June 17 – Pierre Reverdy (born 1889), French poet
 August 8 – Harry Kemp, 76 (born 1883), American poet
 August 19 – Frances Cornford (born 1886), English poet
 August 25 – David Diop (born 1927), French West African poet, air crash
 October 9 – Fannie B. Linderman, 85 (born 1875), American poet, writer, educator, entertainer
 October 28 – Margarita Abella Caprile (born 1901), Argentine poet
 October 31 – H. L. Davis, 66 (born 1894), American fiction writer and poet
 November 5 – Richard Rudzitis, 62 (born 1898), Latvian poet, writer and philosopher
 November 9 – Yoshii Isamu 吉井勇 (born 1886), Japanese, Taishō and Shōwa period tanka poet and playwright
 December 25 – H. W. Garrod, 81 (born 1878), English literary scholar

See also

 List of poetry awards
 List of years in poetry
 Poetry

References

Poetry
20th-century poetry